The canton of Le Canigou is an administrative division of the Pyrénées-Orientales department, in southern France. It was created at the French canton reorganisation which came into effect in March 2015. Its seat is in Amélie-les-Bains-Palalda.

It consists of the following communes: 
 
Amélie-les-Bains-Palalda 
Arles-sur-Tech
Baillestavy
La Bastide
Boule-d'Amont
Bouleternère
Casefabre
Casteil
Corneilla-de-Conflent
Corsavy
Coustouges
Espira-de-Conflent
Estoher
Fillols
Finestret
Fuilla
Glorianes 
Joch
Lamanère
Mantet
Marquixanes
Montbolo
Montferrer
Prats-de-Mollo-la-Preste
Prunet-et-Belpuig
Py
Reynès
Rigarda
Rodès
Sahorre
Saint-Laurent-de-Cerdans
Saint-Marsal
Saint-Michel-de-Llotes
Serralongue
Taillet
Taulis
Taurinya
Le Tech
Valmanya 
Vernet-les-Bains
Vinça

References

Cantons of Pyrénées-Orientales